Oxyurichthys chinensis is a species of goby found in the Northwest Pacific: China.

References

chinensis
Fish of the Pacific Ocean
Fish of China
Taxa named by Frank Lorenzo Pezold III
Taxa named by Helen K. Larson
Fish described in 2015